The 2015 season was Malmö FF's 104th in existence, their 80th season in Allsvenskan and their 15th consecutive season in the league. They competed in Allsvenskan where they finished fifth, 2014–15 Svenska Cupen where they were knocked out in the quarter-finals and the 2015–16 UEFA Champions League where they were knocked out in the group stage. Malmö FF also participated in one competition in which the club continued playing in for the 2016 season, 2015–16 Svenska Cupen. The season began with the group stage of Svenska Cupen on 22 February, league play started on 6 April and concluded on 31 October. The season concluded with the last Champions League group stage match on 8 December.

Markus Rosenberg was appointed permanent club captain, succeeding Guillermo Molins, who he had temporarily replaced during the summer of 2014 due to Molins being injured. For the first time in the history of the club, Malmö FF appeared in consecutive UEFA Champions League group stages. The club was not as successful on the domestic stage as they failed to defend their title by finishing fifth in the league. This was the first time that Malmö FF missed out on the top-four since the 2009 season.

Summary

Allsvenskan
The league season started on 6 April 2015 and concluded on 31 October 2015. The official season fixtures were released on 21 January 2015. Malmö FF started the season away against newly promoted GIF Sundsvall on 6 April, Malmö FF won the match 4–1. The club's first home fixture was played on 9 April against last year's third-place team AIK, the match ended in a goalless draw. There was a one-month summer break in June due to Sweden's participation in the 2015 UEFA European Under-21 Championship in the Czech Republic. Malmö FF played no league matches between 7 June and 5 July. The club played its last league fixture of the season at home against IFK Norrköping on 31 October, a 2–0 defeat which saw Norrköping become league champions.

The club got off to a fairly promising start, winning three of the first five games against GIF Sundsvall, title contenders and rivals IFK Göteborg and newly promoted Hammarby IF. Out of these first five games Malmö FF also tied against title rivals AIK and Falkenbergs FF. Notably Malmö FF dropped pole position in the league to Gefle IF on 9 April in the second round of play. The club had held first place in the league since 18 August 2013 for a continuous streak of 599 days, never losing the lead during the victorious 2014 season. Malmö FF continued to win the following two games at home against Halmstads BK and regional rivals Helsingborgs IF. These two wins solidified the club's position as league leaders after seven rounds of play.

The following three matches resulted in a win-less streak of a draw and two losses in a row. Malmö FF first tied the away fixture against IF Elfsborg after a late equaliser from the home side. This was succeeded by defeats against BK Häcken and Kalmar FF, notably the last time Malmö FF won against Häcken was as far back as in October 2011. This was the first time since September 2014 that the club failed to win in three games and the first time since June 2011 that they lost two league matches in succession. This streak was followed by back to back wins against Åtvidabergs FF and Gefle IF and a home draw against Djurgårdens IF. This meant that Malmö FF took up fourth position in the league table at the time of the summer break, seven points behind leaders IFK Göteborg.

When Allsvenskan restarted in July, Malmö FF experienced another struggling period as they failed to win any of the first three matches after the break, an away loss against IFK Norrköping and two consecutive draws against Örebro SK. This was followed by a four-match undefeated streak in which Malmö FF defeated GIF Sundsvall, league leaders IFK Göteborg, Gefle and drew against Åtvidaberg. After 20 rounds of play, Malmö FF was in fifth place in the league, four points behind IFK Göteborg in first place. In the next-coming five games, the club won three, drew one and lost one. By 25 rounds the gap to the trio of leading teams had increased to seven points and Malmö FF was now forth, one point ahead of Elfsborg.

With five matches remaining, Malmö FF still had a realistic chance of retaining the title if they won the remaining fixtures. That chance quickly vanished with a goalless draw away at Halmstad and an away loss against fellow title contender AIK in the 27th round. The primary focus for Malmö FF now was to reach a fourth-place finish. After wins against Kalmar and Hammarby in the 28th and 29th round respectively, Malmö FF had a two-point advantage over Elfsborg for fourth place. In the last round, Malmö FF played a home fixture against league leaders IFK Norrköping. A draw would have sufficed for Malmö FF to clinch fourth place, but a motivated Norrköping won the match 2–0 and captured their first league title in 26 years. Since Elfsborg won their last match, Malmö FF ended the season in fifth place.

Svenska Cupen
Malmö FF qualified for the group stage of the 2014–15 Svenska Cupen in the 2014 season by beating IS Halmia 2–1 on 15 November 2014. The club were seeded first in the group stage draw after finishing first in the 2014 Allsvenskan. The groups were drawn on 19 November 2014. Malmö FF drew Jönköpings Södra IF who finished fourth in Superettan for the 2014 season, Assyriska FF who finished 14th in the same league and Hudiksvalls FF who finished second in Division 2 Norrland.

The group stage was played between 22 February and 7 March 2015 before the start of the league season. Malmö FF beat Assyriska 3–0 in the opening group fixture at Malmö IP on 22 February 2015. In the second round, the club travelled to Hudiksvall and won 5–0 on 28 February 2015. In the last group match Malmö FF faced Jönköpings Södra at Malmö IP and won 4–0 on 7 March 2015. These results positioned Malmö FF top of the group table and the club advanced to the quarter-finals.

The quarter finals were drawn on 9 March 2015, Malmö FF were drawn against fellow Allsvenskan team Örebro SK who finished in sixth place last year. Malmö FF were seeded in the drawn and had home advantage for the fixture which was played at Malmö IP on 14 March 2015. Malmö FF lost the fixture 1–0 and were therefore knocked out of the competition.

The draw for the second round of the 2015–16 Svenska Cupen was held on 7 August 2015. Malmö FF were drawn against Götene IF, a side that played in Division 3 Mellersta Götaland, the match was played on 8 November 2015. The fixture was postponed until after the league season since Malmö FF were still active in the qualification campaign for the 2015–16 UEFA Champions League. Malmö FF won the match 5–0 and progressed to next season's group stage.

UEFA Champions League
Malmö FF qualified for the 2015–16 UEFA Champions League by merit of finishing first in the 2014 Allsvenskan. The club entered the competition in the second round of qualification. The draw for the second qualifying round was held on 22 June, Malmö FF was seeded in the draw. The club was drawn against the 2014 Lithuanian champions FC Žalgiris. This will be the first time that Malmö FF face Lithuanian opposition in European competition. The first leg of the second round was played on 15 July at Swedbank Stadion in Malmö, the match ended in a goalless draw. The second leg was played on 21 July at the LFF Stadium in Vilnius, Malmö FF won the match 1–0 and advanced to the third qualifying round with an aggregate score of 1–0.

The draw for the third round of qualification was held on 17 July 2015, Malmö FF were unseeded in the draw. The club was drawn against the 2014–15 Austrian champions Red Bull Salzburg. This was the second consecutive season that Malmö FF played Salzburg as they met in last year's play-off round where Malmö FF advanced to the group stage with an aggregate score of 4–2. The first leg of the third round was played on 29 July at Red Bull Arena in Wals-Siezenheim where Salzburg came out victorious 2–0. The second leg was played on 5 August at Swedbank Stadion in Malmö, Malmö FF won the match 3–0 and advanced to the play-off round with an aggregate score of 3–2.

The draw for the play-off round was held on 7 August 2015, Malmö FF were unseeded in the draw. The club was drawn against the 2014–15 Scottish champions Celtic. This was fourth time that Malmö FF faced Scottish opposition in Europe, the first since the 2011 season in the UEFA Champions League when Malmö FF beat Rangers in the third qualifying round with an aggregate score of 2–1. The first leg of the play-off round was played on 19 August at Celtic Park. Celtic won the first match 3–2, Malmö FF managed to keep down the score after being down 2–0 and 3–1. The second leg was played on 25 August at Swedbank Stadion. Malmö FF won the return tie 2–0 and the tie ended with an aggregate score of 4–3. With this result they progressed to the group stage for the second consecutive season.

The draw for the group stage was held on 27 August 2015 in Monaco, France. Malmö FF were seeded in pot 4 which consisted of the lowest ranked teams. The club was drawn against Spanish runners-up Real Madrid, French champions Paris Saint-Germain and Ukrainian runners-up Shakhtar Donetsk. Malmö FF played their first match of the group stage, an away fixture against Paris Saint-Germain on 15 September, and concluded the group stage on 8 December with an away fixture against Real Madrid. In the six group stage matches Malmö FF gathered three points and ended up in fourth place, thus being knocked out of the Champions League and further European competition for the 2015–16 season. In the six matches the club won one match, the home fixture against Shakhtar Donetsk 1–0, and lost the other five matches. Shakhtar Donetsk was also the only team that Malmö FF managed to score against.

Key events
 30 October 2014: Defender Matias Concha retires.
 13 November 2014: Midfielder Erik Andersson joins the club on a four-year contract, transferring from Landskrona BoIS. Midfielder Oscar Lewicki joins the club on a three-year contract, transferring from BK Häcken.
 19 November 2014: Defender Tobias Malm leaves the club.
 26 November 2014: Forward Petter Thelin leaves the club, transferring to Kramfors-Alliansen.
 12 December 2014: Midfielder Simon Thern leaves the club, transferring to Heerenveen.
 13 December 2014: Defender Ricardinho leaves the club, transferring to Gabala.
 15 December 2014: Forward Magnus Eriksson leaves the club, transferring to Guizhou Renhe.
 19 December 2014: Goalkeeper Marko Johansson is promoted to the first team squad on a youth contract basis, signing a two-year contract to keep him at the club until the end of the 2016 season. Defender Franz Brorsson is promoted to the first team squad on a youth contract basis, signing a two-year contract to keep him at the club until the end of the 2016 season.
 7 January 2015: Midfielder Emil Forsberg leaves the club, transferring to RB Leipzig.
 12 January 2015: Midfielder Markus Halsti leaves the club, transferring to D.C. United.
 13 January 2015: Defender Alexander Blomqvist leaves the club on loan to IFK Värnamo for the duration of the season.
 14 January 2015: Midfielder Tobias Sana joins the club on a four-year contract, transferring from Ajax.
 19 January 2015: Midfielder Jo Inge Berget joins the club on a three-year contract, transferring from Cardiff City.
 22 January 2015: Forward Isaac Kiese Thelin leaves the club, transferring to Bordeaux.
 23 January 2015: Forward Benjamin Fadi leaves the club on loan to Mjällby AIF for the duration of the season. Goalkeeper Sixten Mohlin leaves the club on loan to Västerås SK for the duration of the season.
 26 January 2015: Midfielder Magnus Wolff Eikrem joins the club on a three-year contract, transferring from Cardiff City.
 27 January 2015: Defender Yoshimar Yotún joins the club on a three-year contract, transferring from Sporting Cristal.
 11 February 2015: Midfielder Amin Nazari leaves the club on loan to Fredrikstad for the duration of the season.
 13 February 2015: Forward Markus Rosenberg is chosen as the club's new captain.
 11 March 2015: Defender Andreas Vindheim joins the club on a four-year contract, transferring from Brann.
 13 March 2015: Defender Johan Hammar leaves the club on loan to Fredrikstad for the duration of the season.
 20 March 2015: Midfielder Piotr Johansson leaves the club on loan to Ängelholms FF for the duration of the season.
 25 March 2015: Defender Rasmus Bengtsson joins the club on a five-year contract, transferring from FC Twente.
 31 March 2015: Midfielder Petar Petrović leaves the club on loan to IFK Värnamo until 15 July 2015.
 10 April 2015: Forward Markus Rosenberg signs a new three-year contract, keeping him at the club until the end of the 2017 season.
 29 June 2015: Defender Kári Árnason joins the club on a two and a half year contract, transferring from Rotherham United.
 1 July 2015: Goalkeeper Robin Olsen leaves the club, transferring to PAOK.
 8 July 2015: Midfielder Vladimir Rodić joins the club on a three and a half year contract, transferring from Rad.
 9 July 2015: Defender Erik Johansson leaves the club, transferring to Gent.
 11 July 2015: Defender Felipe Carvalho joins the club on a two and a half year contract, transferring from Tacuarembó.
 17 July 2015: Forward Nikola Đurđić joins the club on a six months loan contract, transferring from Augsburg.
 22 July 2015: Goalkeeper Johan Wiland joins the club on a two and a half year contract, transferring from Copenhagen.
 22 July 2015: Defender Filip Helander leaves the club, transferring to Hellas Verona.
 27 July 2015: Goalkeeper Fredrik Andersson joins the club on a one and a half year contract, with an option to extend the contract for one year, transferring from Örgryte IS. Midfielder Mattias Svanberg is promoted to the first team squad on a youth contract basis, signing a one and a half year contract to keep him at the club until the end of the 2016 season.
 14 October 2015: Forward Teddy Bergqvist is promoted to the first team squad on a youth contract basis, signing a two-year contract to keep him at the club until the end of the 2017 season.

Players

Squad

Squad stats

Players in/out

In

Out

Disciplinary record

Club

Coaching staff

Other information

Competitions

Overall

Allsvenskan

League table

Results summary

Results by round

Matches
Kickoff times are in UTC+2 unless stated otherwise.

Svenska Cupen

2014–15
The tournament continued from the 2014 season.

Kickoff times are in UTC+1 unless stated otherwise.

Group stage

Knockout stage

2015–16
The tournament continued into the 2016 season.

Qualification stage

UEFA Champions League

Qualifying phase and play-off round

Kickoff times are in UTC+2 unless stated otherwise.

Second qualifying round

Third qualifying round

Play-off round

Group stage

Times up to 25 October 2014 (matchdays 1–3) are CEST (UTC+2), thereafter (matchdays 4–6) times are CET (UTC+1).

Non-competitive

Pre-season
Kickoff times are in UTC+1 unless stated otherwise.

Mid-season
Kickoff times are in UTC+2 unless stated otherwise.

Post-season
Kickoff times are in UTC+1 unless stated otherwise.

Footnotes

Malmö FF seasons
Malmo FF
Malmo